Phi Geminorum, Latinized from φ Geminorum, is a binary star in the constellation Gemini, to the southwest of Pollux. It is visible to the naked eye with an apparent visual magnitude of 4.95. Based upon an annual parallax shift of 14.66 mas, this system is located around 220 light years from the Sun.

The two components of this system have a circular orbit with a period of 582 days. The primary component is an A-type main sequence star with a stellar classification of A3 V. It is around 600 million years old and spinning relatively rapidly with a projected rotational velocity of 165 km/s. This rate of spin is giving the star an oblate shape with an equatorial bulge that is 6% larger than the polar radius. The star has nearly double the mass of the Sun and radiates 36.5 times the solar luminosity from its outer atmosphere at an effective temperature of 8,551 K.

References

A-type main-sequence stars
Gemini (constellation)
Geminorum, Phi
Durchmusterung objects
Geminorum, 83
064145
038538
03067
Astrometric binaries